Bailey may refer to:

People and fictional characters
 Bailey (surname)
 Bailey (given name)

Castles and bridges
 Bailey (castle), or ward, a courtyard of a castle or fortification, enclosed by a curtain wall
 Bailey bridge, a portable prefabricated truss bridge

Places
 The Bailey, a historic area in the centre of Durham, England
 Bailey, Colorado, US, an unincorporated community
 Bailey, Minnesota, US, an unincorporated community
 Bailey, Mississippi, US, an unincorporated community
 Bailey, Missouri, US, an unincorporated community
 Bailey, North Carolina, US, a town

 Bailey, Oklahoma, US, a ghost town
 Bailey, Texas, US, a city
 Mount Bailey (disambiguation), two mountains in the US and one in Antarctica
 Bailey Brook (West Branch French Creek tributary), Pennsylvania, US
 Bailey Creek (disambiguation)
 Bailey Park, Austin, Texas, US
 Bailey Peninsula, Wilkes Land, Antarctica
 Bailey Rocks, on the north side of Bailey Peninsula
 Bailey Peninsula, Washington, US, site of Seward Park (Seattle)

Arts and entertainment
 Bailey, New Hampshire, a fictional town depicted in the comic book Mister Miracle
 The title character of Beetle Bailey, a comic strip created by Mort Walker
 Bailey, a type of robot in the television series Cleopatra 2525'
 Bailey, a dog character in A Dog's Purpose'' and other novels by W. Bruce Cameron and their adaptations

Other uses
 Bailey, a sea area in the BBC Shipping Forecast
 Bailey Road, Patna, India
 Bailey Sweet (apple), also referred to as Bailey, a cultivar of the domesticated apple
 Bailey (dog), Elizabeth Warren's dog
 Bailey Aviation, a British aircraft manufacturer
 Bailey Distinguished Member Award, the highest honor of The Clay Minerals Society
 Baileys Women's Prize for Fiction, now known as the Women's Prize for Fiction

See also
 Old Bailey, nickname of the Central Criminal Court in London, England
 Baileys Irish Cream, a type of alcoholic liqueur commonly known as Baileys
 Bailey House (disambiguation)
 Bailey Limestone, a geologic formation in Indiana, US
 Baily (disambiguation)
 Baley (disambiguation)
 Bayley (disambiguation)
 BAILII, British and Irish Legal Information Institute
 Bəyli, village in the Qabala Rayon of Azerbaijan.
 Bayli (singer), American singer